Rhodocyclus tenuis is a bacterium from the genus of Rhodocyclus. Rhodocyclus tenuis expresses the high potential iron-sulfur protein (HiPIP).

References

External links
Type strain of Rhodocyclus tenuis at BacDive -  the Bacterial Diversity Metadatabase

Rhodocyclaceae
Bacteria described in 1984